Eugenio in Via Di Gioia is an Italian indie folk/pop band formed in 2012.

History
The band is named after its members – "Eugenio" after Eugenio Cesaro; "Via" after Emanuele Via; "Di Gioia" after Paolo Di Gioia – and can be roughly translated both as "Eugene in Joy Street" and "Eugene [is] about to [have] joy".

They debuted in 2013 with the extended play EP urrà and their first studio album Lorenzo Federici – named after the fourth member Lorenzo Federici – was released in 2014.

The band participated at the "Newcomers" section of the Sanremo Music Festival 2020 with the song "Tsunami", produced by Dardust. The song won the Critics' Award "Mia Martini".

Discography

Studio albums 
 Lorenzo Federici (2014)
 Tutti su per terra (2017)
 Natura viva (2019)
 Amore e rivoluzione (2022)

Compilations 
 Tsunami (Forse vi ricorderete di noi per canzoni come) (2020)

Extended plays 
 EP urrà (2013)

Singles 
 "Giovani illuminati" (2017)
 "Chiodo fisso" (2017)
 "Altrove" (2018)
 "Cerchi" (2018)
 "Camera mia" (2019)
 "Lettera al prossimo" (2019)
 "Tsunami" (2019)
 "L'unico sveglio" (2019)
 "A metà strada" feat. Moglii (2020)
 "Non vedo l'ora di abbracciarti" (2021)
 "Umano" (2021)
 "Terra" (2022)

References

External links 
 

Musical groups established in 2012
Musical groups from Turin
Italian pop music groups
Italian folk music groups
2012 establishments in Italy